Konur is a village in Gülnar district of  Mersin Province, Turkey. At  it is situated to the northwest of Gülnar. The population of Konur was 422 as of 2012.

References

Villages in Gülnar District